Carl Llewellyn Weschcke (September 10, 1930 – November 7, 2015) was an American publisher and the president/owner of Llewellyn Worldwide (formerly Llewellyn Publications) from 1961 until his death. He received nationwide media attention when he bought the supposedly haunted Summit Avenue Mansion in St. Paul, Minnesota in 1964, and claimed to have "numerous odd experiences" there.

Born in St. Paul, Weschke bought Llewellyn Publications in early 1961 when he was president of Chester-Kent, Inc. In 1970, Weschcke opened the Gnostica Bookstore in Minneapolis, as well as the "Gnostica School for Self-Development", based on Gnostic teachings. He also began the Gnostic Aquarian Festivals in Minneapolis, also known as Gnosticon during the 1970s, which helped fuel the rise in awareness of occult and metaphysical teachings.

Weschcke was elected president of the NAACP's Minnesota branch in 1959 and vice president of the ACLU's Minnesota branch in 1965.

References

General references
Rosemary Ellen Guiley, The Encyclopedia of Witches &Witchcraft
Raven Grimassi, Encyclopedia of Wicca & Witchcraft
George Knowles, "Carl Weschcke", "Controverscial.Com"

Businesspeople from Saint Paul, Minnesota
American publishers (people)
1930 births
2015 deaths
20th-century American businesspeople
American occultists